Ward Lloyd Cuff (August 12, 1913 – December 24, 2002) was an American football halfback and placekicker in the National Football League (NFL) for the New York Giants, Chicago Cardinals, and Green Bay Packers. He played college football at Marquette University and was drafted in the fourth round of the 1937 NFL Draft.

As a fullback at Marquette, Cuff played in the first Cotton Bowl game, in 1937, losing to TCU. He was also Marquette's heavyweight boxing champion and held the school record in the javelin throw. Cuff played for the Giants from 1937 to 1945, won the NFL championship in 1938, and became the team's career scoring leader with 319 points before being traded to the Cardinals. He played one season with the Cardinals and one with the Packers. He led the NFL in field goals made four times. After his NFL career, Cuff coached high school football in Green Bay, was an assistant coach for the Oregon State Beavers football team, and later worked for The Boeing Company.

His number 14 was retired by the Giants, although owner Wellington Mara gave Y. A. Tittle permission to wear it during his time with the Giants from 1961 to 1964. It was retired again in honor of both players.

References

External links
 JockBio.com
 

1913 births
2002 deaths
American football running backs
Chicago Cardinals players
Green Bay Packers players
Marquette Golden Avalanche football players
New York Giants players
People from Redwood Falls, Minnesota
United States Army Air Forces personnel of World War II
National Football League players with retired numbers